Barilius bakeri is a fish in genus Barilius of the family Cyprinidae. It is found in Kerala of India.

References 

Barilius
Cyprinid fish of Asia
Freshwater fish of India
Fish described in 1865